Pius Nkonzo Langa SCOB (25 March 1939 – 24 July 2013) was Chief Justice of South Africa, serving on the Constitutional Court. He was appointed to the bench in 1994 by Nelson Mandela, he became Deputy Chief Justice in 2001 and was elevated as Chief Justice in 2005 by Thabo Mbeki. He retired in October 2009. He died in 2013, aged 74, following a long illness.

Legal career
Pius Langa was born on 25 March 1939 in Bushbuckridge, in the then Transvaal Province. He obtained his B. Iuris law degree from the University of South Africa in 1973 and his LLB in 1976. 

He worked in a shirt factory from 1957 to 1960 but then found employment as an interpreter and messenger for the Department of Justice.  He worked his way up to serving as a prosecutor and a magistrate. He was admitted as an Advocate of the Supreme Court of South Africa in June 1977, practised at the Natal Bar and attained the rank of Senior Counsel in January 1994. He was a founding member of the National Association of Democratic Lawyers and a member of the African National Congress Constitutional Committee, where he worked on its draft bill of rights, which later formed part of Chapter Two of the Constitution of South Africa.

When the Constitutional Court was established in 1994 after the end of apartheid, Justice Langa was appointed together with ten others as the first Judges of the new Court. He became its Deputy President in August 1997 and, in November 2001, assumed the position of Deputy Chief Justice of South Africa. He was appointed as the country’s Chief Justice and head of the Constitutional Court with effect from June 2005 until his retirement in October 2009.

Justice Langa died on 24 July 2013 (age 74) at the Milpark Hospital in Johannesburg, following a long illness.

Honours and awards
In April 2008 Justice Langa was awarded the Order of the Baobab in Gold for "his exceptional service in law, constitutional jurisprudence and human rights."

References

External links

Transformative Constitutionalism and Socio-Economic Rights Video of lecture by Chief Justice Pius Langa for the Foundation for Law, Justice and Society, Oxford
Article about Langa
"A Man Who Would Not Bend", timeslive.co.za. Accessed 17 May 2022.

1939 births
2013 deaths
20th-century South African judges
20th-century South African lawyers
21st-century South African judges
Chief justices of South Africa
Judges of the Constitutional Court of South Africa
Order of the Baobab
People from Johannesburg
South African Senior Counsel
University of South Africa alumni